Arantxa Sánchez Vicario was the defending champion, but lost in the semifinals to Jennifer Capriati.

Steffi Graf won the title by defeating Jennifer Capriati 6–1, 0–6, 6–3 in the final.

Seeds
The first eight seeds received a bye into the second round.

Draw

Finals

Top half

Section 1

Section 2

Bottom half

Section 3

Section 4

References

External links
 Official results archive (ITF)
 Official results archive (WTA)

1993 WTA Tour